The Oxford Companion to Classical Literature is a book in the series of Oxford Companions produced by Oxford University Press.  It is compiled and edited by Sir Paul Harvey, Fellow of St Anne's College, Oxford and lecturer in Classical Languages at the University of Oxford.

The book provides an alphabetically arranged reference to classical literature. The second edition was published in 1989, the third in 2011.

.

External links 

 OUP information

Oxford Companion to Classical Literature
Oxford University Press reference books
Books of literary criticism
Classics publications